Esterina Sanchez known as Essie Sanchez (born 1958) is a Philippine-born Norfolk Islander international lawn bowler.

Bows career
Sanchez won the gold medal in the pairs with Carmen Anderson at the 1997 Asia Pacific Bowls Championships in Warilla. Six years later she won a pairs bronze in Warilla and then won a third medal at the Atlantic Championships during the 2007 tournament in Christchurch.

She was selected to represent the Norfolk Islands at four Commonwealth Games. The first was in the singles at the 2006 Commonwealth Games, the second in the pairs at the 2010 Commonwealth Games and the third in the pairs and fours at the 2014 Commonwealth Games.

In 2022, she competed in her fourth Games at the 2022 Commonwealth Games in the women's triples and the Women's fours.

References

1958 births
Living people
Bowls players at the 2006 Commonwealth Games
Bowls players at the 2010 Commonwealth Games
Bowls players at the 2014 Commonwealth Games
Bowls players at the 2022 Commonwealth Games
Norfolk Island sportspeople
Norfolk Island bowls players